Víctor Antonio García Dávila (born 6 April 1954) is a Mexican politician from the Labor Party. From 2001 to 2002 he served as Deputy of the LVIII Legislature of the Mexican Congress representing Sinaloa.

References

1954 births
Living people
Politicians from Chihuahua (state)
Labor Party (Mexico) politicians
21st-century Mexican politicians
People from Delicias, Chihuahua
Deputies of the LVIII Legislature of Mexico
Members of the Chamber of Deputies (Mexico) for Sinaloa